Munditia mayana, common name May's munditia, is a species of small sea snail, a marine gastropod mollusk, in the family Liotiidae.

Description
The size of the shell varies between 4 mm and 8 mm.

Distribution
This marine species is endemic to Australia. It occurs off South Australia, Tasmania, Victoria and Western Australia.

References

 Tate, R. 1899. A revision of the Australian Cyclostrematidae and Liotiidae. Transactions of the Royal Society of South Australia 23(2): 213-229
 Cotton Bernard, Southern Australian Gastropoda Part I Streptoneura; Transactions of the Royal Society of South Australia v. 69 (1), 1945
 Cotton, B.C. 1959. South Australian Mollusca. Archaeogastropoda. Handbook of the Flora and Fauna of South Australia. Adelaide : South Australian Government Printer 449 pp
 Jenkins, B.W. 1984. Southern Australian Liotiidae. Australian Shell News 47: 3-5 
 Wilson, B. 1993. Australian Marine Shells. Prosobranch Gastropods. Kallaroo, Western Australia : Odyssey Publishing Vol. 1 408 pp.

External links
 To World Register of Marine Species
 

mayana
Gastropods described in 1899